Anna d'Este (16 November 1531 – 17 May 1607) was an important princess with considerable influence at the court of France and a central figure in the French Wars of Religion. In her first marriage she was Duchess of Aumale, then of Guise, in her second marriage Duchess of Nemours and Genevois.

Life

Anna d'Este was born on 16 November 1531, the eldest daughter of the Duke of Ferrara Ercole II (son of Lucrezia Borgia and grandson of Pope Alexander VI) and his wife, Renée of France (daughter of King Louis XII of France). She grew up in Ferrara, where she received an excellent education. The future writer and scholar Olympia Fulvia Morata was chosen as one of her companions at court.

In 1548, after long and difficult negotiations, her marriage was arranged with the French prince Francis, Duke of Aumale, son of the Duke of Guise. The contract was signed in Ferrara on 28 September and the marriage was held in Saint-Germain-en-Laye near Paris on 16 December. The princess was never to return to Italy. Anna was the granddaughter of the French king Louis XII and therefore related to Henry II and his sons. 

By her marriage she had become a member of the powerful Guise family, and because of her Italian roots she had especially close ties to the queen and later queen-mother, Catherine de' Medici. For these reasons, her position at court was outstanding. Duchess of Guise after the death of her father-in-law in 1550, she governed the family estates and the enormous fortunes of the Guise with the help of her mother-in-law, Antoinette de Bourbon. She was active on behalf of her father and acted as mediator between the courts of France and of Ferrara. She gave birth to seven children, four of whom reached adulthood. 

In February 1563 Francis, Duke of Guise, was assassinated. While the murderer was seized and immediately put to death, Anna took all possible steps to sue the leader of the French Huguenots, Gaspard de Coligny, whom she held responsible.  During the next three years, the widow put pressure on the king and his courts of justice with her petitions, but in January 1566 the king's council declared the admiral of Coligny innocent and imposed eternal silence in the matter. Consequently, most of her contemporaries held the widow of the Duke of Guise responsible for the shot which was fired on Coligny on 22 August 1572 and which became the starting signal for the St. Bartholomew's Day massacre. 

On 29 April 1566, Anna married Jacques of Savoy, Duke of Nemours and Genevois. Henceforth, the princess spent most of her time in Annecy or on the road between her duchy of Genevois and the court of France. In politically difficult situations she acted as mediator between her husband and the Duke of Savoy, and in the meantime she held her position at the court of France. Anna promoted her sons' careers, she helped her clients to make their living, and she claimed a prominent place in official ceremonies at court. After the death of her second husband in 1585, Anna lived in Paris, in her Hôtel de Nemours, on the left bank of the Seine, in what is today Rue Séguier. With the formation of the Catholic League, in which her sons played a prominent part, her importance increased considerably. 

In December 1588 Henry III ordered the murder of her two oldest sons and the imprisonment of Anna d'Este. Although the sources tell us nothing about the deeds of the Duchess after her liberation, some contemporaries held her responsible for the assassination of the king. During the siege of Paris by Henry IV, Anna was declared "queen-mother" by the League, but after the Bourbon's conversion back to Catholicism she recognized him as king and tried to convince her rebellious sons to take the same step. In 1594 Anna traveled to Paris to pay homage to Henry IV. Anna spent her last years in the highly respectable position of "superintendante de la maison" of the queen, Marie de' Medici, but also in growing indebtedness and in constant worry about the financial situation of her children and grandchildren.

Death
When she died on 17 May 1607, the value of her movable goods came to little more than  4000 livres. The entrails and the heart of the Duchess were interred in Paris and in Joinville while her body was brought to Annecy, where it was buried next to her second husband. None of the tombs remain.

Significance

With regard to the confessional disputes, Anna's life does not differ much from those of other princesses of her time. Her mother was a Calvinist, her father, husbands, and sons were more or less radical Catholics. She helped to increase the acceptance of Henry IV following his conversion to Catholicism. In other regards, she held a special position at the court of France, which can be seen from the numerous lawsuits she was involved in. Although the entanglement in legal proceedings even for minor causes was quite common for the French aristocracy of the early modern period, it was Anna and her mother who contested the king's right to Brittany, and in doing so they referred to their positions as daughter and granddaughter of a French king.

Family

Children from the marriage with Francis, Duke of Guise (1519–1563):
 Henry, prince of Joinville, then Duke of Guise (1550–1588)
 Catherine, Duchess of Montpensier (1551–1596), married Louis, Duke of Montpensier
 Charles, Marquis, then Duke of Mayenne (1554–1611)
 Louis, archbishop of Reims, then Cardinal of Guise (1555–1588)
 Antoine (1557–1560)
 François (1559–1573)
 Maximilien (1562–1567/68)

Children of the marriage with Jacques de Savoie (1531–1585):
 Charles Emmanuel, prince of Genevois, then Duke of Nemours (1567–1595)
 Marguerite (1569–1572)
 Henry I, Marquis of Saint-Sorlin, then Duke of Nemours (1572–1632)
 Emmanuel Philibert (died young)

Ancestry

Notes

Sources

Further reading

 
 Christiane Coester: Schön wie Venus, mutig wie Mars. Anna d'Este, Herzogin von Guise und von Nemours (1531–1607). Oldenbourg, Munich (2007); .
 Huguette Leloup: Anne d'Este (1531–1607). Fille aînée de Renée de France, Duchesse de Guise puis duchesse de Nemours, Dame de Montargis. Special issue of the Bulletin de la Société d'Émulation de l'Arrondissement de Montargis. 3rd ser., pp. 119, 2002.
 Jessica Munns, Penny Richards: Exploiting and destabilizing Gender Roles: Anne d'Este. In: French History. Vol. 6 (1992), pp. 206–215.
 Matteo Sanfilippo: article: Este, Anna d'''. In: Dizionario biografico degli Italiani''. Vol. 43, Istituto della Enciclopedia Italiana, Rome (1993), pp. 315–320.

External links
 
  
 

Anna
1531 births
1607 deaths
Anna
Anna
Anna
16th-century French women
17th-century Italian women
Anna
Anna
Anna
Anna
Anna
People of the French Wars of Religion
Italian ladies-in-waiting
French ladies-in-waiting
Household of Catherine de' Medici
Daughters of monarchs